Cheverly is a side-platformed Washington Metro station in Cheverly, Maryland, United States. The station was opened on November 20, 1978, and is operated by the Washington Metropolitan Area Transit Authority (WMATA). Providing service for the Orange Line, the station is the first station going east in Maryland on the Orange Line. The station is in the residential area of Cheverly at Columbia Park Road near U.S. Route 50. It is a commuter station with 530 parking spaces. In 2021, Cheverly had the lowest average weekly ridership of any Metro station.

History

The station opened on November 20, 1978.

From March 26, 2020, until June 28, 2020, this station was closed due to the 2020 coronavirus pandemic.

In May 2018, Metro announced an extensive renovation of platforms at twenty stations across the system. New Carrollton station was closed from May 28, 2022, through September 5, 2022, as part of the summer platform improvement project, which also affected the Minnesota Avenue, Deanwood, Cheverly, and Landover stations on the Orange Line. Shuttle buses and free parking were provided at the closed stations.

Station layout

References

External links
 

 The Schumin Web Transit Center: Cheverly Station
 Station from Google Maps Street View

Washington Metro stations in Maryland
Stations on the Orange Line (Washington Metro)
Railway stations in the United States opened in 1978
1978 establishments in Maryland